Csaba Regedei (born 16 January 1983) is a former Hungarian footballer.

External links
 

1983 births
Living people
People from Oroszlány
Hungarian footballers
Association football defenders
Hungary international footballers
Győri ETO FC players
Rákospalotai EAC footballers
Újpest FC players
FC DAC 1904 Dunajská Streda players
Pécsi MFC players
Gyirmót FC Győr players
Slovak Super Liga players
Hungarian expatriate footballers
Expatriate footballers in Slovakia
Hungarian expatriate sportspeople in Slovakia
Sportspeople from Komárom-Esztergom County